Juan Manuel Correa Borja (born August 9, 1999) is an American-Ecuadorian racing driver who races under an American license and competes in the 2023 FIA Formula 2 Championship with Van Amersfoort Racing.

Career

Karting 
Correa began karting professionally in 2008, taking titles across Ecuador and the United States, becoming the Rotax Max Challenge Junior Champion in 2013. During his karting days, he was noticed by the now-defunct Formula One team Lotus F1's driver's program.

Lower formulae 
In 2016, Correa made his single-seater debut with Prema Powerteam in both the ADAC Formula 4 and Italian F4 championships. Over the campaign, he amassed three wins and claimed sixth in Italian F4 and tenth in ADAC F4. The following year, Correa repeated this campaign, but mostly focusing on ADAC F4.

GP3 Series 

In August 2017, Correa made his debut in the series at the Spa-Francorchamps round with Jenzer Motorsport. Correa signed with Jenzer Motorsport for the full-time campaign in 2018 GP3 Series. The American was unable to amass any podiums, despite starting from reverse grid pole on two occasions in the sprint race. Nevertheless, he scored 42 points and finished twelfth in the standings, four positions ahead of his only full-time teammate Tatiana Calderón.

FIA Formula 2 Championship 

2019 was Correa's first full FIA Formula 2 season, alongside teammate Callum Ilott for Sauber Junior Team by Charouz. His first round did not go well, with finishes outside the top 15. Correa's fortunes changed at Baku however, where, after finishing seventh in the feature race and scoring his first ever Formula 2 points, he achieved a second place finish in the Sprint Race. Through the next rounds in Barcelona and Monaco the American failed to score any points, but he returned to the podium at Le Castellet, where he got another second place, crossing the finish line just two seconds behind Anthoine Hubert. These would be Correa's final points finish of the season, with three consecutive weekends without points leading up to the round at Spa-Francorchamps.

Accident at Spa-Francorchamps 
On August 31, 2019, Correa was involved in a serious crash with Hubert on the second lap of the feature race of the 2019 Spa-Francorchamps FIA Formula 2 round, Belgium. Hubert subsequently died from his injuries, and Correa's injuries were severe enough to eliminate him from further competition in the 2019 Formula 2 season. Correa hit Hubert's car at 218 km/h, registering a peak g-force of 65G. Correa's media team released a statement a few hours after the accident confirming that he had suffered fractures to both of his legs and a minor spinal injury. They also stated that he had been helicoptered to hospital, had undergone surgery, and had been admitted to intensive care. His condition was described as stable. He was reported to have remained conscious following the crash.

On September 7, 2019, a statement issued by Correa's family confirmed that he was diagnosed with acute respiratory distress syndrome after being transferred to an intensive care unit in London, and had been placed in an induced coma under ECMO support after falling into acute respiratory failure.

On September 20, 2019, Correa's family issued a statement confirming that Correa had been taken out of ECMO support, and had been woken from the induced coma. The family further confirmed that medical priority had been shifted from Correa's lungs to his legs, as critical surgery could not be performed until his lungs had recovered enough to withstand a lengthy procedure. By September 28, Correa's lungs were strong enough to proceed; Correa opted for an approach to save as much of his right leg as possible, as opposed to a first step involving the amputation of his foot. The surgery was scheduled for September 29. The reconstructive surgery was largely deemed a success, though Correa faced at least a year of rehabilitation after his injuries.
Correa was announced as the winner of the FIA Americas award in the car category, receiving his award in person from his wheelchair on 14 January 2020. He was given a standing ovation from the audience, which included FIA officials that had flown to Panama City, Panama, from Geneva, Switzerland for the event: Deputy President of Sport, Graham Stoker; and Deputy President of Mobility and Tourism, Thierry Willemarck.

Controversy during recovery 
Correa complained, in an interview with NTV published on 28 January 2020, that the FIA had ignored him and left him without support during his recovery. He said:
Dr. Christian Wahlen, the chief medical officer at Spa at the time of the accident, responded to this on 28 January 2020. He said that Correa had received "immediate medical care" from the doctor attending the scene of the accident, "administered by the circuit-appointed doctor who is an experienced anaesthetist". Wahlen went on to say that "the activities of medical staff attending the accident were coordinated by FIA deputy F1 medical delegate and F1 rescue coordinator doctor Ian Roberts", and that Correa was flown to Liege hospital after "consulting with doctor Alain Chantegret, FIA F1 medical delegate". Wahlen also claims that he and President of the FIA Institute Gérard Saillant, a leading orthopaedic surgeon, were both constantly updating the family during the following days.

Wahlen said that "On Tuesday morning Juan Manuel developed symptoms indicating a respiratory problem. On the same day, the Correa family took the decision to transfer him to a specialist clinic at a hospital in London". The interview details the involvement of FIA doctors over the three days of Sunday to Tuesday, and that Correa was taken out of their immediate care. On 10 February 2020 Correa clarified the situation surrounding the first article. He stated that the article, written by a journalist from essentiallysports.com, was out of context. Correa said:
In a video interview with The Race, published on 15 February 2020, Correa opens up about the aftermath of the accident. He states that he saw his legs were shattered, and "it seemed like they were [only] connected by the suit, they were like gelatine". He asked the doctor at the scene of the crash "to put me to sleep because of the pain. I went into the coma, and I woke up from the coma two weeks later, so actually I really regained my consciousness about three weeks after the crash."

FIA Formula 3 Championship

2021 

Correa made his racing comeback in the 2021 FIA Formula 3 Championship with ART Grand Prix, partnering Frederik Vesti and Aleksandr Smolyar. He scored his first point of his return in the second race of the season at the Circuit de Barcelona-Catalunya. His next points came at the second round in Le Castellet, where he finished sixth in the first sprint race and ninth in the feature race, collecting seven points. Correa achieved two more points finishes during the year and finished the season 21st in the championship with 11 points. Correa later took part in post-season testing with ART Grand Prix at the Circuit Ricardo Tormo.

2022 

Correa remained with ART Grand Prix for the 2022 season. He finished 13th in the final standings, eight places better than prior season, and having scored a podium at Zandvoort sprint race.

Return to the FIA Formula 2 Championship

2021: Post-season test return 
In 2021, Correa tested for his old team Charouz Racing System in the post-season test, but did not end up driving for them due to his commitments in his F3 return.

2022 
Correa replaced David Beckmann and made his return to the FIA Formula 2 Championship in 2022, driving for Van Amersfoort Racing during the Yas Marina season finale. Making his first F2 start in more than three years, he described that he was "ready for the challenge no matter what happens".  After qualifying 18th, Correa was the 15th driver to see the checkered flag in the feature race. However, the slight improvement from his grid slot was short lived, as he received a five-second time penalty for causing a collision with Marino Sato after the race, dropping him back into to eighteenth place. In the feature race, he finished 17th, to end the championship in 27th place. Following that, he remained with his team for post-season testing.

2023 
Correa made his full-time return to Formula 2 in 2023 with Van Amersfoort Racing alongside Richard Verschoor.

Formula One 
During his karting years, Correa was put into the junior program of the Lotus F1 Team, but was dropped following the team's takeover by Renault. He was signed as Alfa Romeo Racing's development driver for the  season. In August 2019, Correa got his first experience of an F1 car with the 2013 Sauber C32 at Circuit Paul Ricard, completing 62 laps. After recovering from his accident throughout 2020 Correa was announced to have re-signed with the Sauber Junior Team.

Endurance racing

2021 
At the end of 2021, Correa tested Prema Powerteam's LMP2 endurance racing car, the first time he drove an endurance racing car.

2022 
In February 2022, Prema Powerteam announced that Correa would participate in the 2022 European Le Mans Series with them. Due to Formula 3 commitments and an injury, he only contested the final two rounds, the first of which at Spa-Francorchamps came third. He won his first endurance race during the season finale in Portimão, helping Prema become the teams' champions.

2023 
Correa is confirmed to race the 9 car with Prema Racing, in the 2023 FIA World Endurance Championship in the LMP2 category although some rounds are scheduled to clash with his Formula 2 races.

Karting record

Karting career summary

Racing record

Racing career summary 

† Correa did not compete in the required number of rounds to be eligible for a championship position.

Complete Italian F4 Championship results 
(key) (Races in bold indicate pole position) (Races in italics indicate fastest lap)

† Correa did not compete in the required number of rounds to be eligible for a championship position.

Complete ADAC Formula 4 Championship results 
(key) (Races in bold indicate pole position) (Races in italics indicate fastest lap)

Complete GP3 Series results 
(key) (Races in bold indicate pole position) (Races in italics indicate fastest lap)

Complete Toyota Racing Series results 
(key) (Races in bold indicate pole position) (Races in italics indicate fastest lap)

Complete FIA Formula 2 Championship results 
(key) (Races in bold indicate pole position) (Races in italics indicate points for the fastest lap of top ten finishers)

* Season still in progress.
† Driver did not finish the race, but was classified for completed over 90% of the race distance.

Complete FIA Formula 3 Championship results 
(key) (Races in bold indicate pole position; races in italics indicate points for the fastest lap of top ten finishers)

Complete European Le Mans Series results 
(key) (Races in bold indicate pole position; results in italics indicate fastest lap)

Complete FIA World Endurance Championship results
(key) (Races in bold indicate pole position) (Races in italics indicate fastest lap)

* Season still in progress.

References

External links 
 

1999 births
Living people
Sportspeople from Quito
Ecuadorian racing drivers
American racing drivers
Italian F4 Championship drivers
ADAC Formula 4 drivers
GP3 Series drivers
FIA Formula 2 Championship drivers
FIA Formula 3 Championship drivers
Ecuadorian emigrants to the United States
Prema Powerteam drivers
Jenzer Motorsport drivers
M2 Competition drivers
Charouz Racing System drivers
ART Grand Prix drivers
European Le Mans Series drivers
Karting World Championship drivers
Van Amersfoort Racing drivers
Sauber Motorsport drivers
FIA World Endurance Championship drivers